Drumraney (Irish: Droim Raithne) is a village in the County Westmeath, Ireland, just off the R390 regional road between Athlone and Mullingar.  It is part of a small parish with a population of approximately 240 which includes the nearby village of Tang. It is approximately 12 km from Athlone.

Amenities
It is home to a primary school, community centre, shops, post office, small businesses and to Maryland GAA football club which has provided county players.

Notable people
 Kieran Martin, Gaelic footballer
 Fr. Timothy Shanley (1781–1835)

See also
 List of towns and villages in Ireland

References

Towns and villages in County Westmeath
Articles on towns and villages in Ireland possibly missing Irish place names